Hezekiah Allen (February 25, 1863 – September 21, 1916) was a Major League Baseball catcher. In 1 career game, he had two hits in three at-bats. It is unknown which hand he batted and threw with.

Allen was born in Westport, Connecticut and died in Saugatuck, Connecticut.

References

External links

 

1863 births
1916 deaths
Philadelphia Quakers players
Major League Baseball catchers
Baseball players from Connecticut
People from Westport, Connecticut
19th-century baseball players